Honkytonk Homeslice is a band created by The String Cheese Incident frontman Bill Nershi. The band consists of Bill Nershi, his wife Jilian Nershi, and singer-songwriter, Scott Law.  Honkytonk Homeslice began in the summer of 2004, when the trio was singing and playing at their campsite at Horning's Hideout, during a String Cheese-sponsored music festival in Oregon.

The band says they are "drawing on the whole history of bluegrass, old time music, pre-Nashville country, the psychedelic country music of Gram Parsons and Emmylou Harris, even a few String Cheese and Talking Heads tunes."

Their self-titled debut CD contains thirteen songs of acoustic Americana music. This album is a return to roots for Bill Nershi, who says "this band takes the music back to the kind of shows SCI did when it began."

References

Musical groups from Portland, Oregon
2004 establishments in Oregon
Musical groups established in 2004